CHILDREN AT RISK is a 501(c)(3) non-profit organization that drives changes for children through research, education, and influencing public policy. Founded in the year of 1989 in Houston, Texas and with an office opened in North Texas in 2011, the organization focuses on the well-being of children and educates legislators on the importance of solving children's issues while at the same time focusing on a variety of issues, and the primary issues are human trafficking, food insecurity, education, and parenting. CHILDREN AT RISK also has a North Texas office in Dallas,Texas. Some of CHILDREN AT RISK's previous primary issues were juvenile justice, mental health, and Latino children.

The mission is to improve the quality of life for children through strategic research, public policy analysis, education, collaboration, and advocacy. The organization strives to make children's needs a priority and to ensure ample resources are available for children and their families to thrive.

History 
Children At Risk began in the fall of 1989 when a group of child advocates met to discuss the lack of documentation on the status of children and the absence of strong public policy support for Houston's children.  For over twenty years, Children At Risk has been speaking out and driving changes on behalf of our city's most defenseless youth, led by its original mission ’’To serve as the voice for children.’’ Using the tools of advocacy, Children At Risk works on a broad range of children's issues, including child welfare, education, child trafficking, juvenile justice, mental and physical health, and parenting.  Their efforts are focused where they are needed: where a significant number of children are affected, and where they can enhance, but not duplicate, the work of others.

Over its history, Children At Risk has evolved from an organization researching the multitude of obstacles our children face, to one that also drives macro-level change to better the future of our state through community education, collaborative action, evidence-based public policy, and advocating for our youth at the local and state level.  Through its Public Policy & Law Center—established in 2006 as the only center of its kind in Texas—Children At Risk uses policy and legal expertise as a powerful tool to drive change and create a better future for our children.  In recent years, Children At Risk has grown exponentially in its capacity to speak out and drive change for Texas's children and has become the premier resource on children's issues among major media outlets, public officials, and the non-profit sector. In addition, the organization has spread its voice in the community through a weekly radio show, appearances on television and radio broadcasts, and partnerships with newspapers.

Issue areas

Human trafficking 

Having witnessed a need for policy changes in the area of human trafficking, Children At Risk has worked with public officials at the state capitol to strengthen the anti-trafficking laws in Texas since 2007.  In addition, Children At Risk has worked collaboratively with others to launch a broad educational and outreach campaign to combat human trafficking.

To raise awareness on child trafficking in Texas, Children At Risk' has:
Launched expansive educational outreach campaigns in Houston, Dallas, and Brownsville through press conferences, public service announcements, and billboards.  In 2008, CHILDREN AT RISK generated over 330 media hits focused solely on human trafficking.
Directly educated over 1,000 community leaders, lawyers, and judges over the past year on the trafficking and exploitation of children and ways to identify victims through two State Summits, continuing legal education seminars, and trainings for CPS employees, juvenile probation officers, school guidance counselors as well as social work and legal students.

Children At Risk researched, drafted, and helped to pass several key pieces of legislation to strengthen the laws surrounding human trafficking.  As a result, Texas law has:

Mandated that bars and nuisance hotels/motels post a sign about forced labor and include the number for the national human trafficking hotline number
Designated a statewide human trafficking task force to improve data collection and align existing state resources to fight human trafficking
Mandated training of law enforcement officers to enable them to identify trafficking victims
Required a study of alternatives to the juvenile justice system for victims
Created a victim assistance program for domestic human trafficking victims
Created liability for the trafficker regardless of whether he knew the victim was a minor

Children At Risk continues to research and draft legislation following recommendations from Shared Hope International.

Food insecurity 
Children At Risk has proposed that the Texas Legislature require schools with student populations of 80% or more living at or below 185% of the federal poverty level to provide free school breakfast to all interested students. The 80% threshold is useful as it allows school districts to utilize the “severe need’’ designation and receive a higher federal reimbursement rate per student meal. Schools that serve 60% or more of their meals at a free or reduced price are classified as “severe need”. This threshold also allows economies of scale to lower the per-meal cost provided to students, due to the higher volume of meal production and consumption. In the 2010 school year, all “severe need” schools received the following federal reimbursement:  $0.26 for each paid breakfast, $1.76 for each free breakfast and $1.46 for each reduced-price breakfast. The price of breakfast for students varies across the state from 20 cents for reduced price meals to $1.25 for full price.

Education

Charter schools 

Using a combination of research, analysis, and public policy,  the Public Education team at CHILDREN AT RISK works to raise awareness about underperforming charter schools in Houston. While Children At Risk has recognized charter schools like KIPP and YES Prep among the top ten public schools in the city of Houston, clusters of low-performing charters are consistently found at the bottom of the annual public school rankings. The policy team at CHILDREN AT RISK is committed to ensuring that high-quality charter schools proliferate and that low-performing charters are held accountable.

School rankings 
The purpose of Children At Risk's school rankings is to both provide a tool to parents and students regarding the quality of local schools and to give information to campuses and districts on how they perform relative to their peers. To evaluate the performance of public schools across the state, Children At Risk examines sixteen indicators at the high school level, twelve at the middle school level, and sixteen at the elementary level.

Children At Risk ranks schools across the state of Texas and Alabama.

Parenting and child abuse 
The Center for Parenting and Family Well-Being advocates to change the way parent education and child abuse prevention is approached in the greater Houston community through prevention and population-based strategies. The Center believes that organizations across different sectors should come together to create an infrastructure that strives to provide all parents in the Houston metropolitan area with effective and accessible parent education. The Center for Parenting and Family Well-Being does not provide direct services. Instead, it collaborates with and supports organizations that provide direct services to ensure that the infrastructure, policies, and partnerships are in place to improve the availability of evidence-based parent education.

Past Issue Areas

Juvenile justice 

The Juvenile Justice system should be ensuring public safety and rehabilitating juveniles by implementing evidence-based programs in order to reduce further criminal behavior and to help juveniles flourish into productive citizens. Children At Risk has started numerous initiatives to ensure that the rights of juvenile delinquents in the Texas and Houston are not being infringed upon. Children At Risk has helped establish mental health and drug courts and attempted to reduce adult certifications and misdemeanor Class C ticketing.

Mental health 
Children At Risk conducted the first independent evaluation of the four Juvenile Mental Health Courts in Texas. The report provided a comparison of quality, cost, and effectiveness of services compared to incarceration, best practices utilized and methods of creation and expansion to provide a road map for counties to establish or improve current juvenile mental health courts. The research has provided needed data for child advocates to maintain or increase funding for community-based mental health services.

Children At Risk also hosted two events, in Dallas and Houston, to educate community members on the topic of Juvenile Mental Health. This brought together mental health experts, state and local stakeholders, community members, advocates, and school representatives to discuss Juvenile Mental Health.

Adult certification 
Children At Risk drafted and advocated for a bill to increase the time for reviewing juveniles in order for the decision to try them as adults to be better informed. When children are unnecessarily transferred to adult courts they frequently suffer more than if they were tried as juveniles.

Class C ticketing 
Class C tickets are often issued in schools for behavioral problems such as disturbing class or skipping school. Misdemeanor charges are harsh penalties for such minor issues. Children At Risk is working to reduce the prevalence of Class C ticketing in schools by conducting interviews with students, parents, and teachers, and collaborating with key organizations working on the issue across the state of Texas.

Latino children 
Children At Risk also encourages greater focus on the unique needs of Latino children across all sectors, including fostering greater academic focus through the first edition of its online, open-access, peer-reviewed Journal of Applied Research on Children.

Legislative Priorities
A selected list of Children At Risk's legislative priorities for the 85th Texas Legislative Session are below. The full list can be found here.

Parenting
 Establish a task force to examine and increase access to evidence-based parent education and quality parent engagement programs in Texas, as well as improve inter-agency coordination between the Texas Health and Human Services Commission, the Texas Workforce Commission, Texas Education Agency, and the Texas Department of Family and Protective Services.
Early Childhood Education

Child Care
 Increase coordination of state-funded child care and public Pre-K data systems at the Texas Education Agency and the Texas Workforce Commission through the Early Childhood Database System to improve outcomes for children and maximize taxpayer dollars.
 Increase transparency by requiring the Texas Workforce Commission to report how state dollars are being spent, including the number and percentage of children receiving subsidies that are participating in high quality child care settings to parents and policy makers.
 Increase local coordination of early education programs by supporting public/private partnerships between school districts and high quality child care centers.
Pre-Kindergarten
 Sustain the High Quality Pre-Kindergarten Grant Program at $236 million for the biennium.
 Create sustainable funding for quality Pre-K through formula funding.
 Expand Pre-K eligibility to children whose parents are whose first responders and have been killed or injured during duty
 Limit Pre-K classrooms to a maximum of 22 students, allowing no more than 11 students for each teacher or aide in Pre-K classes with more than 15 students.
 Increase inter-agency coordination of child care and Pre-K data systems through the Early Childhood Database System to improve outcomes for children and maximize efficiency of taxpayer dollars.
 Increase public/private partnerships between school districts and high quality child care centers.
Expanded Learning Opportunities 
 Extend the Expanded Learning Opportunities Council for four additional years to examine the efficacy of a longer school day/longer school year and to examine best practices for public/private partnerships.
Health
 Establish a workgroup to provide school districts with best practices on recess. Require school districts to develop a locally determined school recess policy.
Human Trafficking
 Set aside convictions of victims of human trafficking for non-violent crimes committed as a direct result of trafficking
 Streamline processes for landlords to evict tenants who are engaged in trafficking activity on leased property.
 Target unlicensed “massage establishments” for deceptive trade practices.
 Improve the curriculum of court-ordered programs for consumers of prostitution to highlight child sex trafficking.
 Establish a statewide data collection system to track all prostitution-related crimes, including crimes related to minors.
 Strengthen the civil nuisance and abatement statutes to enable local governments to more effectively shut down illegal sexually oriented businesses.
 Criminalize the online promotion of prostitution and increase awareness and enforcement of state and federal laws related to online child sex trafficking.

Media

Growing Up in Houston 

Children At Risk's biennial book Growing Up In Houston: Assessing the Quality of Life of Our Children contains research that enables organizations to better serve the children in Houston. Growing Up In Houston contains comprehensive statistics that address the whole child. Our expert contributors evaluate the current state of Houston's kids and discuss best practices for ensuring that we make Houston a better place to raise a family. Organizations use our data to design stronger programs that more effectively address Houston's needs. Over 130 data points are included in the book covering topics from teen suicide and mental health to lead poisoning and high school dropout rates. The biennial book contains policy suggestions at the end of every chapter so that lawmakers can see how to proactively make Houston and Texas a better place for children.

Journal of Family Strengths (JFS) 
The Journal of Family Strengths (JFS), formerly the Family Preservation Journal, is an open-access, peer-reviewed online journal edited by the Children At Risk Institute in partnership with the Center for Family Strengths at the University of Houston–Downtown, and published by the Houston Academy of Medicine-Texas Medical Center Library. The Journal's goal is to facilitate family, worker, supervisor, educator and agency interchange, to promote research and evaluation, and to disseminate information for best practices that support family centered practice. These services may include: child welfare, mental health (wraparound), substance abuse, juvenile justice, developmentally challenged, schools, health care, elders, and other social welfare services. The Journal provides a forum for practitioners, program designers, administrators, researchers, and educators to present and critically review programs, policies, practice methods, and research findings from a family strengths perspective. The Journal is intended to positively impact the form and type of services provided to families. Research and case studies from those receiving and delivering services is encouraged.

The Journal is published annually and led by Co-Editors-in-Chief Alvin Sallee, ACSW, LISW, Angelo Giardino, MD, PhD, MPH, Robert Sanborn, EdD, and an Editorial Board of senior-level academics with expertise in family strengthening.

Journal of Applied Research on Children (JARC)
Launched in the Fall of 2010, the Journal of Applied Research on Children: Informing Policy for Children At Risk (JARC) is an open-access, peer-reviewed online journal edited by CHILDREN AT RISK and published by The Houston Academy of Medicine – Texas Medical Center Library.  JARC serves to inform policy affecting children by providing applicable research to the public, child advocates, and policy-makers on timely children's issues.  JARC seeks to encourage academics to focus on the needs of children and make practical children-focused research available and accessible to the public for use and dissemination.
The Journal is published biannually and led by co-Editors-in-Chief Angelo Giardino, MD, PhD, MPH and Robert Sanborn, EdD, Associate Editors Christopher Greeley, MD, FAAP and Ruth SoRelle, MPH, and an editorial board of senior-level academics from higher education institutions across Texas.

Growing Up in America radio show 
Growing Up in America is Children At Risk's weekly radio show produced by KPFT Pacifica Radio. The show airs live from 3-4 PM CST every Monday. The show features weekly discussions on the status of American children, public policy, and politics. Dr. Bob Sanborn, President and CEO of Children at Risk, co-hosts the show alongside Children at Risk's Policy Director, Mandi Kimball. Guest speakers include public officials, child advocates, and experts on a large variety of issues affecting American children. Topics addressed on the show include, but are not limited to, human trafficking, food insecurity, education, healthcare, childhood obesity, and immigration.

Centers

Public Policy and Law Center 
The Public Policy and Law Center (PPLC) was established in 2006 as an outgrowth of CHILDREN AT RISK's longtime research and advocacy work and in response to the American Bar Association’s appeal to the private bar, “[to] get involved and use its legal expertise on behalf of Houston's children.”  The mission of Children At Risk's Public Policy and Law Center is to improve the lives of children across Texas through:
 Legal and policy research and advocacy;
 Legislative and administrative rule drafting;
 Drafting of amicus briefs and impact litigation; and,
 Continuing education for attorneys and other professionals on children's legal and policy issues.
Led by a Law Advisory Board of over 35 attorneys from the legal and business community and a Public Policy Advisory Board of over 25 leaders from the public policy and non-profit community, and staffed with a dedicated and creative group of attorneys and public policy analysts, the PPLC has been tremendously successful in its first years of operation.

Center to End the Trafficking and Exploitation of Children 
The Center to End the Trafficking and Exploitation of Children (CETEC), the only center of its kind in Texas, was established in 2007 to combat domestic minor sex trafficking through education, the convening of nonprofits and community leaders, and non-partisan advocacy to curb demand and support victims.

In order to increase the identification of victims, Children At Risk is committed to raising awareness and educating the community on the trafficking and exploitation of children through significant media outreach, continuing legal education conferences, and annual State Summits. Children At Risk also authored The State of Human Trafficking in Texas to provide a comprehensive resource on the scope of the problem, services available and needed for victims, and the policies surrounding this issue. Children At Risk is a nationally respected leader in reforming state policy on this issue, and is currently focused on increasing the protection for victims and penalties for individuals who benefit from trafficking. Children At Risk played an integral role in the establishment of Freedom Place, the first safe house for victims of domestic minor sex trafficking in Texas.
Through its Center to End the Trafficking and Exploitation of Children, Children At Risk has:
Conducted comprehensive research on international and domestic trafficking across Texas and on strategies for increasing the identification of trafficking victims through the Human Trafficking Summer Institute
Published The State of Human Trafficking in Texas, a guide that provides public officials and other legal and government professionals with data, background information, and policy analysis on human trafficking in Texas
 Provided a monthly training on human trafficking to the Houston Police Department
 Given presentations to High Schools and Universities.
 Provided a platform for a local survivor to tell her story and advocate for other victims
 Trained pro bono attorneys in 5 different states to enhance their state's human trafficking legislation
 Joined forces with the Human Trafficking Rescue Alliance
 Created the Safe House Now task force to help open the first safe house in Houston

Center for Parenting and Family Well-Being 
The Center for Parenting and Family Well-Being (CPFWB) advocates to change the way parent education and child abuse prevention is approached in the greater Houston community through prevention and population-based strategies.  The Center believes that organizations across sectors should come together to create an infrastructure that strives to provide all parents in our community with effective and accessible parent education.
The Center for Parenting and Family Well-Being is action-oriented and advocates for change through:
 Collaboration.  The CPFWB acts as a convener to bring together providers of parent education, hospitals, universities, school districts, faith-based organizations, childcare centers, nonprofits, local government, and other organizations to collaboratively address how to create an infrastructure to support parent education and family well-being in our community.
 Research.  The CPFWB will identify gaps in parent education services in the greater Houston community and evaluate evidence-based programs for their potential impact.  Through extensive assessments and analyses, the Center will develop recommendations on how to address parent education and family well-being in the greater Houston community.
 Education. The CPFWB will provide information to the greater Houston community on parent education, child abuse prevention, and family well-being through conferences, presentations, print materials, and the media.
 Policy.  The CPFWB partners with CHILDREN AT RISK's Public Policy and Law Center and other organizations to advocate for policy changes that support parent education and child abuse prevention.  Through policy advocacy on the local, state, and federal levels, the Center will work with other advocates to create a sustainable source of funding for parenting support and education.

The Center for Parenting and Family Well-Being is supported by an Academic Advisory Council of six leading academics, pediatricians, and public health practitioners who are experts in child maltreatment prevention, cost-effectiveness research, evaluation, family demography, policy, evidence-based programs, and dissemination.  The Academic Advisory Council oversees the Center's research activities.

Funding and events 
Children At Risk is funded through grants, private donations, and several fundraising events put on throughout the year.

Stand Up for Houston’s Children 

Stand Up for Houston's Children benefits Children At Risk's Public Policy and Law Center – the only such center in Texas devoted to the legal needs of children.  An evening of high-energy fun with cocktails, a live auction and dinner served against a backdrop of live comedy entertainment. Jay Leno was the main act in 2012, and the 2013 act will be comedian and impressionist Frank Caliendo.

Accolades luncheon 
The Accolades Luncheon is an annual luncheon that brings together the city's most outstanding Houstonians to honor them for the work they do in speaking out for children.

Charity Golf Classic 
The Golf Classic is a four-person Florida scramble following lunch with on-course activities and an awards celebration with a dinner buffet and live auction immediately following the tournament. Melissa Wilson of Fox News KRIV has been the host of the Golf Classic for the past several years.

Leadership 
Dr. Bob Sanborn is the president and CEO of Children At Risk and has held that title since 2005. Dr. Charlotte Carlisle is the managing director of the North Texas office. Amelia Royce is an intern of Children at risk A list of current staff can be found here

A board of directors composed of prominent community members oversees Children At Risk, and several other boards oversee various aspects of the organization. There is the Public Policy Advisory Board, the Law Advisory Board, the Children At Risk Institute, and an Advisory Board that oversees the North Texas office.

References

Children's rights organizations in the United States